Meathead is a rock band from Italy.

Members
Mauro Teho Teardo (vox, guitar, sampler), Deison (sampler, vox), G.No (bass), V.Dunmore (noises, tapes, files), Nicky (drums), Matt (drums) Wayne Rooney (Actual Meathead)

Meathead released their first album, "Street Knowledge", in 1992, it was a mix of indie sound, hip-hop, electric engines, industrial noises and anger lyrics talking about underground culture.

In 1993, after a long tour (also as supporter for Helmet and Biohazard), the band was asked to write a track for the compilation tribute to Charles Manson, "Coming down fast".

In the 1994 Meathead started an intensive collaboration with Paolo Favati from Pankow, who worked at the production of single "Dick Smoker". Follows up the album "Bored Stiff", distributed in Europe, and the mini album under the new name Circus of Pain and titled "The Swamp Meat Intoxication" as the result of the collaboration with the Swiss band Swamp Terrorists.

The "Meathead against the world" cd (1995–96), represents the complex experience of collaborations of the band with the most relevant artists of the international underground scene like Cop Shoot Cop, Pain Teens, Zeni Geva, Babyland, Scorn, Bewitched.

In 1997, the album "Protect Me From What I Want" was released and distributed in both Europa and USA by Dynamica/Noise records.
After the release Meathead stopped all the activities.

Discography
Street Knowledge - released 1992 on helter Skelter
Bored Stiff - released 1994 on Sub/Mission/SPV
Dick Smoker Plus (split with Cop Shoot Cop) - released 1996 on Fifth Column
kill a COP for christ and bring us his HEAD (split with Cop Shoot Cop) - released 1996 on Sub/Mission/SPV
Meathead Against The World (compilation of split singles with Cop Shoot Cop, Zeni Geva, Babyland and Pain Teens) - released 1996 on Sub/Mission/SPV
Protect Me From What I Want - released 1998 on Dynamica

External links
[ Allmusic]

Italian musical groups